Mycobacterium marinum is a slow growing mycobacterium (SGM) belonging to the genus Mycobacterium and the phylum Actinobacteria. The strain marinum was first identified by Aronson in 1926 and it is observed as a pathogenic mycobacterium. For example, tuberculosis like infections in fish (mycobacteriosis) and skin lesions in humans.

Mycobacterium marinum is a mycobacterium which can infect humans. It was formerly known as Mycobacterium balnei. Infection is usually associated either with swimming or with keeping or working with fish (aquarium granuloma).

Whole genome sequence of M. marinum (M strain) was first published in 2008 and later with the emerge of Next Generation Sequencing (NGS), marinum type strain or patient isolates genome sequences were published.

Phylogeny 
Initial phylogenetic studies using the gene 16S rDNA sequence data shows M. marinum is close to M. tuberculosis and M. ulcerans.

References 

marinum
Fish diseases